Szczepanowice is a district of Opole, south-west Poland.

Szczepanowice may also refer to:
 Szczepanowice, Kraków County in Lesser Poland Voivodeship (south Poland)
 Szczepanowice, Tarnów County in Lesser Poland Voivodeship (south Poland)
 Szczepanowice, Łódź Voivodeship (central Poland)